Chahar Cheshmeh-ye Olya (also Romanized as Chahār Cheshmeh-ye ‘Olyā; also known as Chahār Cheshmeh and Chahār Cheshmeh-ye Bālā) is a village in Torqabeh Rural District, Torqabeh District, Torqabeh and Shandiz County, Razavi Khorasan Province, Iran. At the 2006 census, its population was 172, in 40 families.

References 

Populated places in Torqabeh and Shandiz County